Lead styphnate (lead 2,4,6-trinitroresorcinate, C6HN3O8Pb ), whose name is derived from styphnic acid, is an explosive used as a component in primer and detonator mixtures for less sensitive secondary explosives.  Lead styphnate is only slightly soluble in water and methanol. Samples of lead styphnate vary in color from yellow to gold, orange, reddish-brown, to brown. Lead styphnate is known in various polymorphs, hydrates, and basic salts. Normal lead styphnate monohydrate, monobasic lead styphnate, tribasic lead styphnate dihydrate, and pentabasic lead styphnate dehydrate as well as α, β polymorphs of lead styphnate exist.

Lead styphnate forms six-sided crystals of the monohydrate and small rectangular crystals.  Lead styphnate is particularly sensitive to fire and the discharge of static electricity. Long thin crystals are particularly sensitive. Lead styphnate does not react with other metals and is less sensitive to shock and friction than mercury fulminate or lead azide.  It is stable in storage, even at elevated temperatures. As with other lead-containing compounds, lead styphnate is toxic owing to heavy metal poisoning.

Preparation
Although never substantiated, lead styphnate may have been discovered by Peter Griess (of Griess test fame) in 1874. In 1919, Edmund Herz first established a preparation of anhydrous normal lead styphnate by the reaction of magnesium styphnate with lead acetate in the presence of nitric acid.

{C6N3O8}MgH2O + Pb(CH3CO2)2   →   {C6N3O8}PbH2O  + Mg(CH3CO2)2

Structure
Normal lead styphnate exists as α and β polymorphs, both being monoclinic crystals. The lead centres are seven-coordinate and are bridged via oxygen bridges. The water molecule is coordinated to the metal and is also hydrogen-bonded to the anion. Many of the Pb-O distances are short, indicating some degree of covalency. The styphnate ions lie in approximately parallel
planes linked by Pb atoms.

Properties
Lead styphnate's heat of formation is −835 kJ mol−1. The loss of water leads to the formation of a sensitive anhydrous material with a density of 2.9 g cm−3. The variation of colors remains unexplained. Lead styphnate has a detonation velocity of 5.2 km/s and an explosion temperature of 265–280 °C after five seconds.

Applications
Lead styphnate is mainly used in small arms ammunition for military and commercial applications. It serves as a primary explosive used in firearms primers, which will ignite upon a simple impact. Lead styphnate is also used as primer in microthrusters for small satellite stationkeeping.

References

External links
National Pollutant Inventory - Lead and Lead Compounds Fact Sheet

Lead(II) compounds
Explosive chemicals
Nitrobenzenes
Phenolates